The Eclipse Stakes is a horse race in Great Britain.

Eclipse Stakes may also refer to:

 Eclipse Stakes (MRC), a Melbourne Racing Club horse race in Australia
 Eclipse Stakes (Canada), a horse race in Canada
 Eclipse Stakes (United States), a Thoroughbred horse race in the United States
 Eclipse (greyhounds), a greyhound race in Great Britain